Toni Sandra Marks (born 19 July 1994) is a field hockey player from South Africa. In 2020, she was an athlete at the Summer Olympics.

Personal life
Toni Marks was born and raised in Gqeberha.

Career

Under–21
In 2013, Marks made her debut for the South Africa U–21 team at the FIH Junior World Cup in Mönchengladbach.

National team
Marks made her senior international debut for South Africa in 2014, during a test series against Scotland in Pretoria. From her debut until 2017, Marks only appeared sporadically in the national team.

Although she hadn't made an appearance for the national team in over four years, Marks was named to the South Africa squad for the 2020 Summer Olympics in Tokyo. She made her Olympic debut on 24 July 2021, in the Pool A match against Ireland.

References

External links

1994 births
Living people
Female field hockey forwards
South African female field hockey players
Sportspeople from Port Elizabeth
Field hockey players at the 2020 Summer Olympics
Olympic field hockey players of South Africa
21st-century South African women